The Howells Lake-Howells River North mine is a large iron mine located in east Canada in Newfoundland and Labrador. Howells Lake-Howells River North represents one of the largest iron ore reserves in Canada and in the world having estimated reserves of 11.74 billion tonnes of ore grading 22% iron metal.

References 

Iron mines in Canada